Miyazaki may refer to:

People
 Hayao Miyazaki, Japanese animator
 Hidetaka Miyazaki, video game director
 Gorō Miyazaki, Japanese film director and landscaper, and son of Hayao Miyazaki.
 For others, see Miyazaki (surname)

Places
 Miyazaki Prefecture
 Miyazaki (city)
 Miyazaki Airport

Others
 Caritas Sisters of Jesus, said of Miyazaki, Catholic female congregation